Sericostachys is a genus of flowering plants belonging to the family Amaranthaceae.

Its native range is Tropical Africa.

Species
Species:

Sericostachys scandens 
Sericostachys tomentosa

References

Amaranthaceae
Amaranthaceae genera